The 2016–17 Maryland Eastern Shore Hawks men's basketball team represented the University of Maryland Eastern Shore during the 2016–17 NCAA Division I men's basketball season. The Hawks, led by third-year head coach Bobby Collins, played their home games at Hytche Athletic Center as members of the Mid-Eastern Athletic Conference. They finished the season 14–20, 9–7 in MEAC play to finish in sixth place. They defeated North Carolina A&T and Bethune–Cookman in the MEAC tournament before losing in the semifinals to North Carolina Central.

Previous season
The Hawks finished the 2015–16 season 10–22, 7–9 record in MEAC play to finish in a tie for fifth place. They lost to Morgan State in the first round of the MEAC tournament.

Preseason 
The Hawks were picked to finish in eighth place in the preseason MEAC poll. Bakari Copeland was named to the preseason All-MEAC second team.

Roster

Schedule and results

|-
!colspan=9 style=| Non-conference regular season

|-
!colspan=9 style=| MEAC regular season

|-
!colspan=9 style=| MEAC tournament

References

Maryland Eastern Shore Hawks men's basketball seasons
Maryland Eastern Shore